The Order of the Partisan Star is a national award of former socialist nations, which was awarded to military and civilian personnel during wartime and peacetime operations.

Order of the Partisan Star (Albania)
Order of the Partisan Star (Yugoslavia)